James Baumann Peck (December 11, 1880 – June 22, 1955) was a Canadian track and field athlete who competed in the men's 800 metres for the Montreal Athletic Club.

References

1880 births
1955 deaths
Olympic track and field athletes of Canada
Athletes (track and field) at the 1904 Summer Olympics
Canadian male middle-distance runners